Centi (symbol c) is a unit prefix in the metric system denoting a factor of one hundredth. Proposed in 1793, and adopted in 1795, the prefix comes from the Latin , meaning "hundred" (cf. century, cent, percent, centennial). Since 1960, the prefix is part of the International System of Units (SI). It is mainly used in combination with the unit metre to form centimetre, a common unit of length.

Example
 A honey bee is about 1.3 centimetres long.

See also
Percent

References

SI prefixes
100 (number)